Strombeek-Bever is a town with approximately 11,500 inhabitants in the municipality of Grimbergen, in the province of Flemish Brabant, Belgium. A suburb on the north side of Brussels, it is separated from Grimbergen proper by the R0 ring road around the city. It borders Laken to the south and the municipality of Vilvoorde to the east.

The official language is Dutch (as everywhere in Flanders). Strombeek is home to a substantial minority of French-speakers.

Populated places in Flemish Brabant